Twang is an onomatopoeia originally used to describe the sound of a vibrating bow string after the arrow is released. By extension it applies to the similar vibration produced when the string of a musical instrument is plucked, and similar sounds. The term came to be applied to a nasal vocal resonation, and was historically used to describe "a disagreeable resonance". Later, however, the term came to be more broadly associated with regional dialects, to the extent that in some locations, "a twang is a desirable commodity".

Specific uses of the term include:
 A particular sharp vibrating sound characteristic of some electric guitars.
 A high frequency singing sound especially affected by country singers. It allows for a higher vocal reach than would be possible using the standard guttural technique and can be used as an alternative to falsetto singing. Willie Nelson almost always sings with a twang voice.

See also
 Jangle

References

Nasalization